Old Arabic is the name for the pre-Islamic Arabic language or dialect continuum. Various forms of Old Arabic are attested in many scripts like Safaitic, Hismaic, Nabatean, and even Greek.

Classification 
Old Arabic and its descendants are classified Central Semitic languages, which is an intermediate language group containing the older Northwest Semitic languages (e.g., Aramaic and Hebrew), the languages of the Dadanitic, Taymanitic inscriptions, the poorly understood languages labeled Thamudic, and the ancient languages of Yemen written in the Ancient South Arabian script. Old Arabic, is however, distinguished from all of them by the following innovations:
 negative particles m */mā/; lʾn */lā-ʾan/ > CAr lan
 mafʿūl G-passive participle
 prepositions and adverbs f, ʿn, ʿnd, ḥt, ʿkdy
 a subjunctive in -a
 t-demonstratives
 leveling of the -at allomorph of the feminine ending
 the use of f- to introduce modal clauses
 independent object pronoun in (ʾ)y
 vestiges of nunation

History

Early 1st millennium BCE 
The oldest known attestation of the Arabic language dubbed as pre-Historic Arabic language is a bi-lingual inscription written in Old Arabic which was written in the undifferentiated North Arabian script (known as Thamudic B) and Canaanite which remains undeciphered, discovered in Bayir, Jordan.

A characteristic of Nabataean Arabic and Old Hijazi (from which Classical Arabic much later developed) is the definite article al-. The first unambiguous literary attestation of this feature occurs in the 5th century BCE, in the epithet of a goddess which Herodotus (Histories I: 131, III: 8) quotes in its preclassical Arabic form as Alilat (Ἀλιλάτ, i. e.,ʼal-ʼilāt), which means "the goddess". An early piece of inscriptional evidence for this form of the article is provided by a 1st-century BCE inscription in Qaryat al-Faw (formerly Qaryat Dhat Kahil, near Sulayyil, Saudi Arabia).

The earliest datable Safaitic inscriptions go back to the 3rd century BCE, but the vast majority of texts are undatable and so may stretch back much further in time.

4th century BCE 

Aramaic ostraca dated 362–301 BC bear witness to the presence of people of Edomite origin in the southern Shephelah and the Beersheva Valley before the Hellenistic period. They contain personal names that can be defined as ‘Arabic’ on the basis of their linguistic features:

  (opposed to Northwest Semitic ),  as opposed to Aramaic  and Hebrew 
  diminutives: 
 personal names ending in -w (wawation): 
 personal names ending in feminine -t (as opposed to Aramaic and Hebrew -h): 
 personal names ending in -n [-aːn]: '

2nd century BCE – 1st century CE 

Hismaic inscriptions, contemporaneous with the Nabatean Kingdom attest a variety of Old Arabic which may have merged [ð] with [d]. Furthermore, there are 52 Hismaic inscriptions which attest the formula ḏkrt lt [ðakarat allaːtu] "May Allāt be mindful of", foreshadowing similar formulae which are attested in Christian contexts from northern Syria to northern Arabia during the 6th and possibly 7th centuries CE. One such inscription, found near Wadi Rum, is given below:

2nd century CE 

Following the Bar Kokhba Revolt of 135 CE, literary sources inform that Judea and the Negev were repopulated by pagans. The shift in toponymy towards an Arabic pronunciation, which is only apparent in Greek transcription, would suggest that many of these pagans were drawn from Provincia Arabia. This seems to be recognized by the author of the Madaba map in his entry on Beersheba: ‘Bērsabee which is now Bērossaba’. Compound toponyms with an o-vowel in between their two components (cf. Abdomankō) are reminiscent of an Arabic pronunciation, and probably have their origin in Arabic calques of earlier Canaanite place names.

The En Avdat inscription dates to no later than 150 CE, and contains a prayer to the deified Nabataean king Obodas I:

6th century CE 

The Arabic inscription consists of a list of names carved on the lowest part of the lintel of a martyrion dedicated to St Sergius, the upper parts of which are occupied by inscriptions in Greek and Syriac.

There are two Arabic inscriptions from the southern region on the borders of Hawran, Jabal Usays (528 CE) and Harran (568 CE)

7th century CE 
The Qur'an, as standardized by Uthman (r. 644 – 656), is the first Arabic codex still extant, and the first non-inscriptional attestation of the Old Hijazi dialect. The Birmingham Quran manuscript was radiocarbon dated to between 568 and 645 CE, and contains parts of chapters 18, 19, and 20.

PERF 558 (643 CE) is the oldest Islamic Arabic text, the first Islamic papyrus, and attests the continuation of wawation into the Islamic period.

The Zuhayr inscription (644 CE) is the oldest Islamic rock inscription. It references the death of Umar, and is notable for its fully fledged system of dotting.

A Christian Arabic inscription possibly mentioning Yazid I is notable for its continuation of 6th century Christian Arabic formulae as well as maintaining pre-Islamic letter shapes and wawation.

Phonology

Consonants

Vowels

Grammar

Nominal Inflection

Proto-Arabic

Early Nabataean Arabic 
The ʿEn ʿAvdat inscription in the Nabataean script dating to no later than 150 CE shows that final [n] had been deleted in undetermined triptotes, and that the final short vowels of the determined state were intact. The Old Arabic of the Nabataean inscriptions exhibits almost exclusively the form ʾl- of the definite article. Unlike Classical Arabic, this ʾl almost never exhibits the assimilation of the coda to the coronals.

Example:

pa-yapʿal lā pedā wa lā ʾaṯara
pa-kon honā yabġe-nā ʾal-mawto lā ʾabġā-h
pa-kon honā ʾarād gorḥo lā yorde-nā

"And he acts neither for benefit nor favour and if death claims us let me not be claimed. And if an affliction occurs let it not afflict us".

Safaitic 
The A1 inscription dated to the 3rd or 4th century in a Greek alphabet in a dialect showing affinities to that of the Safaitic inscriptions shows that short final high vowels had been lost, obliterating the distinction between nominative and genitive case in the singular, leaving the accusative the only marked case. Besides dialects with no definite article, the Safaitic inscriptions exhibit about four different article forms, ordered by frequency: h-, ʾ-, ʾl-, and hn-. Unlike the Classical Arabic article, the Old Arabic ʾl almost never exhibits the assimilation of the coda to the coronals; the same situation is attested in the Graeco-Arabica, but in A1 the coda assimilates to the following d, αδαυρα */ʾad-dawra/ 'the region'. The Safaitic and Hismaic texts attest an invariable feminine consonantal -t ending, and the same appears to be true of the earliest Nabataean Arabic. While Greek transcriptions show a mixed situation, it is clear that by the 4th c. CE, the ending had shifted to // in non-construct position in the settled areas.

Example:

ʾAws (bin) ʿūḏ (?) (bin) Bannāʾ (bin) Kazim ʾal-ʾidāmiyy ʾatawa miś-śiḥāṣ; ʾatawa Bannāʾa ʾad-dawra wa yirʿaw baqla bi-kānūn
"ʾAws son of ʿūḏ (?) son of Bannāʾ son of Kazim the ʾidāmite came because of scarcity; he came to Bannāʾ in this region and they pastured on fresh herbage during Kānūn".

Old Hijazi (Quranic Consonantal Text) 
The Qur'anic Consonantal Text shows no case distinction with determined triptotes, but the indefinite accusative is marked with a final /ʾ/. In JSLih 384, an early example of Old Hijazi, the Proto-Central Semitic /-t/ allomorph survives in bnt as opposed to /-ah/ < /-at/ in s1lmh.

Demonstrative Pronouns

Safaitic 

Northern Old Arabic preserved the original shape of the relative pronoun ḏ-, which may either have continued to inflect for case or have become frozen as ḏū or ḏī. In one case, it is preceded by the article/demonstrative prefix h-, hḏ */haḏḏV/.

In Safaitic, the existence of mood inflection is confirmed in the spellings of verbs with y/w as the third root consonant. Verbs of this class in result clauses are spelled in such a way that they must have originally terminated in /a/: f ygzy nḏr-h */pa yagziya naḏra-hu/ 'that he may fulfill his vow'. Sometimes verbs terminate in a -n which may reflect an energic ending, thus, s2ʿ-nh 'join him' perhaps */śeʿannoh/.

Old Hijazi 
Old Ḥiǧāzī is characterized by the innovative relative pronoun ʾallaḏī, ʾallatī, etc., which is attested once in JSLih 384 and is the common form in the QCT.

The QCT along with the papyri of the first century after the Islamic conquests attest a form with an l-element between the demonstrative base and the distal particle, producing from the original proximal set ḏālika and tilka.

Writing systems

Safaitic and Hismaic 

The texts composed in both scripts are almost 50,000 specimens that provide a rather detailed view of Old Arabic.

Dadanitic 
A single text, JSLih 384, composed in the Dadanitic script, from northwest Arabia, provides the only non-Nabataean example of Old Arabic from the Hijaz.

Greek 
Fragmentary evidence in the Greek script, the "Graeco-Arabica", is equally crucial to help complete our understanding of Old Arabic. It encompasses instances of Old Arabic in Greek transcription from documentary sources. The advantage of the Greek script is that it gives us a clear view of the vowels of Old Arabic and can shed important light on the phonetic realization of the Old Arabic phonemes. Finally, a single pre-Islamic Arabic text composed in Greek letters is known, labelled A1.

Aramaic

Nabataean 
Only two texts composed fully in Arabic have been discovered in the Nabataean script. The En Avdat inscription contains two lines of an Arabic prayer or hymn embedded in an Aramaic votive inscription. The second is the Namarah inscription, 328 CE, which was erected about 60 mi southeast of Damascus. Most examples of Arabic come from the substratal influence the language exercised on Nabataean Aramaic.

Transitional Nabataeo-Arabic 

A growing corpus of texts carved in a script in between Classical Nabataean Aramaic and what is now called the Arabic script from Northwest Arabia provides further lexical and some morphological material for the later stages of Old Arabic in this region. The texts provide important insights as to the development of the Arabic script from its Nabataean forebear and are an important glimpse of the Old Ḥigāzī dialects.

Arabic 
Only three rather short inscriptions in the fully evolved Arabic script are known from the pre-Islamic period. They shed little light on the linguistic character of Arabic and are more interesting for the information they provide on the evolution of the Arabic script.

See also 
 Semitic languages
 Arabic language
 Varieties of Arabic

References 

Arabic languages
Languages attested from the 9th century BC
Languages extinct in the 7th century
Extinct languages of Asia
History of the Arabian Peninsula